Western Australian soccer clubs will compete in 2016 for the Football West State Cup, known for sponsorship reasons as the Cool Ridge Cup. Clubs entered from the National Premier Leagues WA, the two divisions of the State League, a limited number of teams from various divisions of the 2016 Amateur League competition, and from regional teams from the South West, Goldfields, Great Southern and Midwest regions.

This knockout competition was won by Floreat Athena, their sixth title.

The competition also served as the Western Australian Preliminary Rounds for the 2016 FFA Cup. The two finalists  – Cockburn City and Floreat Athena – qualified for the final rounds, entering at the Round of 32.

Schedule

A total of 65 teams took part in the competition, from Perth-based and regional-based competitions.

First round
The round numbers conform to a common format throughout the 2016 FFA Cup preliminary rounds. A total of 18 teams took part in this stage of the competition, from lower divisions of the Amateur League, and from regional teams entering from the South West and Midwest regions. Matches in this round were played on 27–28 February.

Second round
A total of 22 teams took part in this stage of the competition, from the Amateur League Premier Division (11 teams), from regional teams entering from the Goldfields and Great Southern regions, and the winners from the previous round. Matches in this round were completed by 13 March 2016.

Notes:
 † = After Extra Time

Third round
A total of 34 teams took part in this stage of the competition. New teams that enter at this round were from Football West State League Division 1 (12 teams) and Football West State League Division 2 (11 teams). Matches in this round were played by 20 March 2016.

Notes:
 † = After Extra Time

Fourth round
A total of 24 teams took part in this stage of the competition. 7 of the 12 Clubs from the National Premier Leagues WA entered into the competition at this stage, with the exception of the top four teams from the 2015 Season who enter in the next round, and Perth Glory Youth who were not eligible. Matches in this round were played on 28 March 2016.

Notes:
 † = After Extra Time.

Fifth round
A total of 16 teams took part in this stage of the competition, with the matches in this round played on 25 April 2016. 4 of the 12 Clubs from the National Premier Leagues WA entered into the competition at this stage, being the top four teams from the 2015 Season.

Sixth round
A total of 8 teams took part in this stage of the competition, with the matches in this round played on 14 May 2016.

Notes:
 † = After Extra Time

Seventh round
A total of 4 teams took part in this stage of the competition, with the matches in this round played on 6 June 2016. The two victorious teams in this round qualify for the 2016 FFA Cup Round of 32.

Final
The 2016 Cool Ridge Cup Final was played on 23 July 2016, at the neutral venue of Dorrien Gardens.

References

Football West State Cup
WA State Challenge